In mathematics, the Milne-Thomson method is a method for finding a holomorphic function whose real or imaginary part is given. It is named after Louis Melville Milne-Thomson.

Introduction

Let  be any holomorphic function.

Example 1: 

Example 2: 

He is really interested in problems 3 and 4, but the answers to the easier problems 1 and 2 are needed for proving the answers to problems 3 and 4.

1st problem

Answer: 

Proof:

Therefore .

Putting  we get .

2nd problem

Problem:  is known,  is unknown,  is real; what is ?

Answer: .

Only example 1 applies here: with  we obtain .

Proof: " is real" means . In this case the answer to problem 1 becomes .

3rd problem

Problem:  is known,  is unknown; what is ?

4th problem

Problem:  is unknown,  is known; what is ?

Answer: .

References 

Analytic functions